Rorippa is a genus of flowering plants in the family Brassicaceae, native to Europe through central Asia, Africa, and North America. Rorippa species are annual to perennial herbs, usually with yellow flowers and a peppery flavour. They are known commonly as yellowcresses.

Rorippa formerly included several species of watercress, now placed in the genus Nasturtium. In particular, R. nasturtium-aquaticum (now N. officinale) and R. microphylla (now N. microphyllum) are often referred to as species of Rorippa.

There are about 75 to 85 species in the genus.

Species include:

Rorippa alpina (S.Wats.) Rydb. – alpine yellowcress
Rorippa amphibia (L.) Bess. – great yellowcress
Rorippa aquatica – lakecress
Rorippa austriaca (Crantz) Bess. – Austrian yellowcress, Austrian fieldgrass
Rorippa backeri (O.E. Schulz) B. Jonsell
Rorippa barbareifolia (DC.) Kitagawa – hoary yellowcress
Rorippa benghalensis
Rorippa calycina (Engel.) Rydb. – persistent-sepal yellowcress
Rorippa cantoniensis – Chinese yellowcress
Rorippa columbiae (Suksd. ex B.L.Rob.) Suksd. ex Howell – Columbian yellowcress, Columbia watercress
Rorippa crystallina – MacKenzie River yellowcress
Rorippa curvipes Greene – bluntleaf yellowcress
Rorippa curvisiliqua (Hook.) Besser ex Britton – curvepod yellowcress, western yellowcress
Rorippa divaricata
Rorippa dubia 
Rorippa elata
Rorippa globosa – globe yellowcress
Rorippa icarica Rech.f.
Rorippa indica Hiern. – variableleaf yellowcress
Rorippa intermedia – intermediate yellowcress
Rorippa islandica – northern yellowcress, northern marsh yellowcress
Rorippa laciniata
Rorippa microtitis – Chihuahuan yellowcress
Rorippa palustris (L.) Bess. – common yellowcress, yellow watercress, marshcress
Rorippa portoricensis – Puerto Rico yellowcress
Rorippa ramosa – Durango yellowcress
Rorippa sarmentosa (G.Forst. ex DC) J.F.Macbr. – longrunner
Rorippa sessiliflora – stalkless yellowcress
Rorippa sinuata (Nutt.) Hitchc. – spreading yellowcress, west yellowcress
Rorippa sphaerocarpa (A.Gray) Britton – roundfruit yellowcress
Rorippa subumbellata Rollins – Tahoe yellowcress, Lake Tahoe yellowcress
Rorippa sylvestris (L.) Bess. – creeping yellowcress, yellow fieldcress, keek
Rorippa tenerrima – Modoc yellowcress
Rorippa teres – southern marsh yellowcress

References

External links

 Brassicaceae: APG II. Missouri Botanical Garden.

 
Brassicaceae genera